Daniele Ghidotti (born 3 March 1985) is an Italian football player who most recently played as a defender for Italian club Prato.

Club career
He made his professional debut in the Lega Pro for Pergocrema on 23 August 2009 in a game against Pro Patria.

References

External links
 
 

1985 births
Sportspeople from the Province of Bergamo
Living people
Italian footballers
A.C. Prato players
U.S. Pergolettese 1932 players
Serie C players
Como 1907 players
Association football defenders
A.S.D. Jolly Montemurlo players
Footballers from Lombardy